Milam Glacier is a major glacier of the Kumaon Himalaya.

History 
Milam glacier was reopened in the year 1994. It was closed in 1962, so it was inaccessible for trekkers and other visitors. It is a popular destination among trekkers now. 

The suitable time to visit the glacier is from mid of March to May. Monsoons set in during the month June which herald the menace of landslides and roadblocks.

The trekking for the Milam glacier commences from Munsiyari.

Milam Glacier is situated on the south facing slope of the main Himalayan range. It originates from the eastern slope of Trishuli and the southern slope of its eastern subsidiary Kohli. The subsidiary glaciers coming off the peaks of Hardeol, Mangraon (6,568 m), Deo Damla (6,637 m), and Sakram (6,254 m) on the eastern rim of the Nanda Devi Sanctuary flow into it from the west, while on the east it is fed by glaciers from Nanda Gond (6,315 m) and Nanda Pal (6,306 m). The glacier is the source of the Goriganga River. The village of Milam lies near the snout of the glacier; Munsiyari, further down the Goriganga valley, is the base for the trek to the glacier.

See also
 List of glaciers
 Shauka - Johar

References

External links
 http://musetheplace.com/milam-glacier/

Glaciers of Uttarakhand
Hiking trails in Uttarakhand
Geography of Pithoragarh district